WVMR may refer to two radio stations, both a part of the Allegheny Mountain Radio network:

 WVMR (AM), a radio station (1370 AM) licensed to serve Frost, West Virginia, United States
 WVMR-FM, a radio station  (91.9 FM) licensed to serve Hillsboro, West Virginia